Gustav Ludwig Goßler (4 April 1879 in Hamburg – 4 April 1940 in Hamburg) was a German rower who competed in the 1900 Summer Olympics.

He was part of the German boat Germania Ruder Club, Hamburg, which won the gold medal in the coxed fours final B.

References

External links

 

1879 births
1940 deaths
Olympic rowers of Germany
Rowers at the 1900 Summer Olympics
Olympic gold medalists for Germany
Olympic medalists in rowing
German male rowers
Medalists at the 1900 Summer Olympics
Rowers from Hamburg